Self-adhesive plastic sheet, known in the United Kingdom as sticky-backed plastic, is wide plastic sheet or film with an adhesive layer on one side, used as a surface coating for decorative purposes. It is typically smooth and shiny, but can also come in textured varieties, in which case it can sometimes be used as a cheap alternative to veneer. The plastic is often PVC. The sheeting is typically sold with a removable paper release liner to prevent it from adhering prematurely.

Self-adhesive vinyl sheet was introduced to the UK market in the 1960s under the brand name Fablon. It was extensively used in DIY at the time, and notably featured in children's DIY projects on the British TV show Blue Peter, but always under the generic name "sticky-backed plastic."

Smooth self-adhesive plastic sheet is typically used to cover the studio floor for shiny-floor shows, thus giving them their name.

See also 
 Contact paper
 Vinyl lettering
 Pressure-sensitive tape

References 

Materials